Amphilochus neapolitanus also known as “algae louse” is a species of amphipod crustacean up to  long. It lives at depths of up to  throughout the Mediterranean Sea and Black Sea, and in parts of the eastern Atlantic Ocean from the North Sea to North Africa. It is usually found on rocks among algae, where it feeds by grazing.

References

Gammaridea
Crustaceans of the Atlantic Ocean
Crustaceans described in 1893